The Norwood state by-election, 1980 was a by-election held on 16 February 1980 for the South Australian House of Assembly seat of Norwood.

The seat had been held by former Premier and Labor MHA Don Dunstan from the 1953 state election, until his resignation in February 1979. The subsequent March 1979 by-election was won by Labor's Greg Crafter, but Crafter lost to the Liberal Party's Frank Webster at the September 1979 state election.

The 1979 state election result was overturned because the Court of Disputed Returns found that a Liberal Party advertisement in an Italian language newspaper, which described  Webster as "your representative" ("il vostro deputato"), gave the false impression that Webster was the sitting member.

Therefore, a by-election was held in February 1980, and Crafter regained the seat.

Result

See also
List of South Australian state by-elections

References

South Australian state by-elections
1980 elections in Australia
1980s in South Australia